The Xiantong Temple is a Buddhist temple located in Taihuai Town of Wutai County, Shanxi, China. The temple has over 400 buildings and the seven main halls along the central axis are the Guanyin Hall, Great Manjusri Hall, Great Buddha Hall, Amitaba Hall, Qianbo Hall, Copper Hall and Buddhist Texts Library. Mount Wutai has 47 Buddhist temples, it is the largest Buddhist complex in China, Xiantong Temple is the largest one with the longest history.

History

Eastern Han dynasty
Xiantong Temple is situated in the north of Taihuai Town of Mount Wutai in Shanxi. The temple was first established in the Yongping period (58–75) in the Eastern Han dynasty (25–220) and initially called "Dafu Lingjiu Temple".

Northern Wei dynasty
In the period of the Northern Wei dynasty (386–534), the temple was expanded and renamed as "Huayuan Temple".

Tang dynasty
The temple was reconstructed in the period of Emperor Taizong (599–649) of Tang dynasty (618–907) with the name of "Great Huayan Temple".

Ming dynasty
In the period of Hongwu (1368–1398) in the early Ming dynasty (1368–1644), the temple was renovated and renamed "Great Xiantong Temple". The name was changed to "Great Jixiang Xiantong Temple" in the period of Yongle Emperor (1402–1424) and "Great Huguo Shengguang Yongming Temple" in the period of Wanli Emperor (1572–1620).

Qing dynasty
In 1687, in the period of Emperor Kangxi (1661–1722) in the Qing dynasty (1644–1911), the temple was renamed as "Great Xiantong Temple" again.

People's Republic of China
After the establishment of PRC, the local government repaired the side halls. In 1957 the Amitaba Hall was restored. From 1974 to 1977, the West Chan Buddhism Hall was restored. In 1979, the Buddhist Texts Library was restored. In 1982, it was listed among the second group of "State Cultural Protection Relics Units" by the State Council of China. In 1983 it has been designated as a "National Key Buddhist Temple in Han Chinese Area". In 1984, the granary was restored. The Mahavira Hall was added to the temple in 2004.

Architecture
The Xiantong temple consists of 400 buildings. The overall gorgeous and elegant colors with characteristics of the palace buildings reflect the precise layout and rich, beautiful and dignified style in the Ming and Qing dynasty (1368–1912).

Amitaba Hall
The brick Amitaba Hall is the fourth hall along the central axis of Xiantong Temple and gets its name from the Amitaba Buddha (Vairocana Buddha) enshrined in it. It is also called "Beamless Hall" since it is built with blue bricks without pillars or columns.

Qianbo Hall
The Qianbo Hall is behind the Amitaba Hall. The hall, for the worship of a copper statue of Manjushri with a thousand alms bowls. The statue of Manjushri has five heads stacked and six hands in front, two of which hold a gold alms bowl in each. There is a sitting statue of Sakyamuni Buddha in the bowl. A thousand hands stretch from the back of the statue with gold alms bowls of a sitting statue of Sakyamuni Buddha in each hand. The statue of Manjushri was made in the Ming dynasty (1368–1644) and also known as "Statue of Manjushri with a Thousand Alms Bowls". Its unique style is rare in China.

Copper Hall
The pure copper made Copper Hall behind the Qianbo Hall is a rarer cultural relic in China. The plane of the hall is square, nine chi wide (1 chi=1/3 meter), eight chi deep and two zhang (1 zhang=10/3 meters). Though with two-story appearance, the hall is actually one story with a room, four pillars and drum-shaped column bases inside. Upper layer of Xiantong Temple is carved with six partition boards and the lower is with eight ones. Ten thousand of golden and spectacular small Buddha statues are carved on the walls of the hall. There are also exquisite and delicate color paintings and patterns of flowers, birds and animals engraved on the columns, architraves and partition boards.

Long Toll Bell
The brass bell hanging in the Bell Tower in front of the temple was cast between 1621 and 1627 during the Ming dynasty (1368–1644) weighing . Outside of the bell cast over ten thousand words of Buddhist inscriptions. When the bell rings, the toll can be heard very far away. Therefore, it is called the "Long Toll Bell", also known as the "Longevity Bell" because in Chinese "long toll" and "longevity" have the same pronunciation.

Gallery

References

Bibliography

External links

Buddhist temples on Mount Wutai
Wutai County
Xinzhou
Major National Historical and Cultural Sites in Shanxi